"Need You Now" is a song recorded by English electronic music band Hot Chip. It is the second official single off their sixth studio album Why Make Sense?. The song was released on 1 April 2015 along with a music video, which was uploaded on the band's YouTube channel. It also peaked at #70 on the Belgium Ultratop chart and at #184 on the French Singles Chart. The song samples vocals from the song "I Need You Now" by Sinnamon.

Music video
The official music video for the song was uploaded on 1 April 2015 on the Hot Chip YouTube channel at a total duration of four minutes and fifty-three seconds and was directed by visual arts group Shynola.

Track listing

12" vinyl

Domino – RUG659T

CD

Digital download

Charts

References

2015 singles
2015 songs
Hot Chip songs
Domino Recording Company singles
Song recordings produced by Mark Ralph (record producer)
Songs written by Alexis Taylor
Songs written by Joe Goddard (musician)
Songs written by Al Doyle